The 1907–08 Army Cadets men's ice hockey season was the 5th season of play for the program.

Season
After three years under Capt. Robert Foy, Lt. George Russell took over as coach and the team responded with a vastly improved effort. The team allowed only 9 goals all season and finished with a winning record.

Roster

Standings

Schedule and results

|-
!colspan=12 style=";" | Regular Season

‡ Army records the game 2–1 in their favor, however, contemporary news reports have the game being won by MIT.

References

Army Black Knights men's ice hockey seasons
Army
Army
Army
Army